Tang Shu Shuen (born 1941) is a former Hong Kong film director.  Though her film career was brief, she was a trailblazer for socially critical art cinema in Hong Kong's populist film industry, as well as its first noted woman director.

Tang was born in Yunnan province, China.  She graduated from the University of Southern California.

Tang's best-known films are her first two, The Arch (1968) and China Behind (1974). The first film looks at the subjugation of women and their sexuality in a traditional village through the story of a widow's unconsummated passion for a male houseguest. The second follows the harrowing journey of a group of college students trying to cross illegally into Hong Kong from a China torn by the Cultural Revolution.

The bleak portrait in China Behind of both communist China and capitalist Hong Kong brought upon it a thirteen-year ban by the British colonial authorities. In addition to their provocative themes, both films used stylistic devices, such as freeze-frames and expressionistic color, possibly inspired by the European art cinema of the 1960s.

Tang made two more, less noted, films, Sup Sap Bup Dup (1975) and The Hong Kong Tycoon (1979).  She also launched the territory's first serious film journal, Close-Up, in 1976.  It stopped publishing in 1979 (Bordwell, 2000).

She ceased filmmaking and emigrated to the United States in 1979, becoming a respected restaurateur in Los Angeles.  Many critics, however, see her influence in the so-called Hong Kong New Wave of edgy, groundbreaking young filmmakers in the late '70s and early '80s.

References
 Bordwell, David.  Planet Hong Kong: Popular Cinema and the Art of Entertainment.  Cambridge, MA: Harvard University Press, 2000.  
 Teo, Stephen. Hong Kong Cinema: The Extra Dimensions. London: British Film Institute, 1997.

External links
 

1941 births
Living people
University of Southern California alumni
Hong Kong emigrants to the United States
Hong Kong film directors